The Statute Law Revision (Ireland) Act 1878 (41 & 42 Vict c 57) is an Act of the Parliament of the United Kingdom.

It was intended, in particular, to facilitate the preparation of a revised edition of the Irish statutes.

This Act was retained for the Republic of Ireland by section 2(2)(a) of, and Part 4 of Schedule 1 to, the Statute Law Revision Act 2007.

The Schedule to this Act was repealed by the Statute Law Revision Act 1894 (57 & 58 Vict c 56).

See also
Statute Law Revision Act

References

Sources

 
  ["Note" and "Schedule" of the bill (unlike the schedule of the act as passed) gives commentary on each scheduled act, noting any earlier repeals and the reason for the new repeal]

Citations

United Kingdom Acts of Parliament 1878